Munjeong is a station on Seoul Subway Line 8. A shopping center sharing the same name is located nearby.

Station layout

Metro stations in Songpa District
Seoul Metropolitan Subway stations
Railway stations opened in 1996